Valerie "Vally" Wieselthier (May 25, 1895 – September 1, 1945) was an Austrian-American ceramic artist.

Biography
Valerie Wieselthier was born to a Jewish family in Vienna, Austria. Her father, Wilhelm Wieselthier, was a lawyer. She attended the Wiener Frauenakademie in Vienna from 1912 to 1914 and studied at the Vienna School of Applied Arts with Rosalinda Rothhansl, Kolo Moser, Josef Hoffmann, and Michael Powolny from 1914 to 1920. In addition, she worked as an auxiliary nurse during the First World War. From 1917 to 1922, she worked for the Wiener Werkstätte. From 1922 to 1927, she ran her own ceramic workshop in cooperation with the Augarten porcelain factory, which was newly founded in 1923, but also with other companies such as Friedrich Goldscheider, Gmundner Keramik and Lobmeyr. Her expressive and humorous porcelain figures attracted attention at the Exposition Internationale des Arts Décoratifs et industriels modern in Paris in 1925 and are considered typical examples of the Art Deco style. From 1928, the artist increasingly moved her center of life to the United States. She went to the International Exhibition of Ceramic Art in New York City in October 1928. In 1933, she moved to Chicago with Paul Lester Wiener and worked as a designer for the Contempora Group and the Sebring Pottery Company. Her use of lead glazes and the potential effect of lead poisoning on her mental and physical health have not been evaluated. 

She died on September 1, 1945 of stomach cancer in a New York hospital.

Her work is held by many museums, including the Metropolitan Museum and Museum of Applied Arts, Vienna.

Literature
 Marianne Hörmann: Vally Wieselthier. 1895–1945. Wien – Paris – New York. Keramik – Skulptur – Design der zwanziger und dreißiger Jahre. Böhlau, Wien 1999  (Zugleich: Universität Innsbruck, Dissertation, 1999)
 Hertha Kratzer: Die großen Österreicherinnen. 90 außergewöhnliche Frauen im Porträt. Ueberreuter, Wien 2001 
 Robert E. Dechant, Filipp Goldscheider: Goldscheider. Firmengeschichte und Werkverzeichnis. Historismus, Jugendstil, Art Déco, 1950er Jahre- Arnold, Stuttgart 2007, .
 Alastair Duncan: Encyclopedia of Art Deco. William Collins, Sydney 1988, S. 183.

References

External links

Austrian ceramists
Wiener Werkstätte
1895 births
1945 deaths
20th-century Austrian women artists
World War I nurses
Deaths from stomach cancer
Deaths from cancer in New York (state)
 Jewish artists
Jewish women artists
Austrian emigrants to the United States